Akiko Seki (September 8, 1899 in Tokyo – May 2, 1973 in Tokyo) was a Japanese soprano. She is commonly recognized as the founder of the movement of The Singing Voice of Japan (Nihon no Utagoe / うたごえ運動, Utagoe-undō). In 1955 she was awarded the Stalin Peace Prize.

Life
March 1921: She graduated in artistic singing at the Music School of Tokyo (Tōkyō Ongaku Gakkō).
May 1, 1946: In the occasion of the first May Day post-war in Tokyo, she conducted L'internationale and a Japanese version of The red flag; this experience led her to the creation of a national musical movement of the working class.
February 10, 1948: She created the Choir of the Communist Youth League of Japan (Nihon-seinen-kyōsan-dōmei Chuō-gassyōdan) in Tokyo, as the core of national musical movement of the working class.
December 20, 1955: She was awarded the Stalin Peace Prize.

Writings
Collection of Songs for Youth (Seinen-kasyū) (Tokyo, Typography of the cultural section of the Communist Youth League of Japan, 1948).
Bewiched by the singing voice (Utagoe ni miserarete) (Tokyo, 1971).

See also

Japanese Communist Party
Democratic Youth League of Japan (successor of the Communist Youth League of Japan)
The Singing Voice of Japan

References

External links
(ja) A real recorded voice of Akiko Seki, greeting the audience of the Festival of The Singing Voice of Japan (in Nippon Budokan, November 1968). 関鑑子の話声録音 - 1968年日本のうたごえ祭典・大音楽会での挨拶（日本武道館にて）
(ja) Official website of the National Council of The Singing Voice of Japan 日本のうたごえ全国協議会ホームページ
(ja) Journal of The Singing Voice of Japan うたごえ新聞ホームページ
(en) Official website of Japanese Communist Party 日本共産党ホームページ（英語）
(ja) Official website of the Democratic Youth League of Japan 日本民主青年同盟ホームページ

Japanese Communist Party
1899 births
1973 deaths
Stalin Peace Prize recipients